

Mondstadt soundtrack

In 2019, video game developer company miHoYo got composer and music producer Yu-Peng Chen, also known as Chen Zhiyi, to produce the soundtrack for their title Genshin Impact with their in-house music studio HOYO-MiX. It was Chen's first major video game work, and he described the project as a difficult challenge. The game has an open-world environment that features areas referred to as regions, with visual designs inspired by different world cultures. In composing the music for these regions, Chen chose a style that integrates elements of traditional folk music with Western musical arrangements. During the pre-release development stage, the game only featured Mondstadt and Liyue, two of the planned seven regions. On top of idyllic rural scenery, medieval European architectural styles and cultures inspired the design of Mondstadt. In composing the music for Mondstadt, Chen borrowed the language and rhythm of Impressionism and used the piano, tin whistle instruments, and medieval-style lutes. In composing the combat music, he used various composition techniques such as polyphony and taking orchestration elements from composers such as Ludwig van Beethoven.

The Mondstadt soundtrack was performed by the London Philharmonic Orchestra with Robert Ziegler as the conductor, and Nick Wollage and Laurence Anslow as music engineers. The coordination with the orchestra was done by Lei Cine Music Management, with preliminary communication taking place five months before the recording. The recording sessions took place from September 16 to 18, 2019, at AIR Studios. Lei Zhang, the founder of Lei Cine Music Management, joined Yu-Peng Chen and HOYO-MiX director Jinhan "Zoe" Cai for the recording in London. At AIR Studios, Chen had conducted the "Genshin Impact Main Theme" himself.

The first original soundtrack album to be produced for Genshin Impact was The Wind and The Star Traveler, which got released on June 19, 2020. All fifteen soundtracks in the album were composed by Yu-Peng Chen. The next soundtrack album, City of Winds and Idylls, is dedicated to the Mondstadt Chapter and commemorates the release of Genshin Impact. The album got released on digital music platforms on September 28, 2020, and the proper release on the official Genshin Impact YouTube channel occurred on November 2, 2020. Two tracks, "Whirl of Boreal Wind" and "Symphony of Boreal Wind", were performed by the Shanghai Symphony Orchestra.

Vortex of Legends, the fifth Genshin Impact soundtrack album, got released on April 2, 2021. It featured a total of seventeen (17) tracks composed by Yu-Peng Chen of HOYO-MiX, each one an original composition for the Dragonspine area. The track listing was first announced on March 31, 2021, on Chinese platforms. The soundtrack was recorded with the International Master Philharmonic Orchestra at the Jintian Recording Studio.

Liyue soundtrack

For Liyue, which had scenic Eastern fantasy as its basis, Chen used elements of Chinese folk music—traditional instruments, the pentatonic scale, and ancient tonal melodies—with Western romantic harmonies and orchestral arrangements. The Liyue soundtrack got performed by the Shanghai Symphony Orchestra at the Shanghai Symphony Hall, with Jiemin Zhang as the conductor. Dong An, one of Chen's mentors from the Shanghai Conservatory of Music, served as a music supervisor during the scoring sessions of the soundtrack. Xiaoxing Lu, noted as a co-awardee at the 44th Annual Grammy Awards for the soundtrack of Crouching Tiger, Hidden Dragon (2000), served as the recording director and consultant. The recording of the Liyue soundtrack took five days.

Jade Moon Upon a Sea of Clouds, the third Genshin Impact soundtrack album to be produced, is dedicated to the Liyue Chapter. It featured a total of sixty-nine (69) tracks all composed by Yu-Peng Chen. One track, "Liyue", was performed by the London Philharmonic Orchestra.

The next soundtrack album for Liyue, Millelith's Watch, got released on June 22, 2022. It featured a total of forty (40) tracks dedicated to The Chasm area, composed by Yu-Peng Chen, Dimeng Yuan, Qian Ding, Yijun Jiang, and Xin Zhao. Before its release, the track listing was announced on June 19. The album saw guest musician Haitao Li on the Morin Khuur. Li was known for performing the instrument on the streets of Shanghai, and had gained significant attention and following online for doing so since 2016.

Inazuma soundtrack

Like the soundtrack for the Liyue region, the music of Inazuma also took on the fusion of traditional or folk musical elements with Western orchestration. Much of the compositions took from historic Japanese melodies. One instance is "Sakura Sakura", which was adapted for the theme of the Electro Archon. After learning about the popularity of previous combat music with players, Yu-Peng Chen chose to compose four combat themes for Inazuma, opposed to the Mondstadt and Liyue regions only having three combat themes each. He also adopted the rhythmic style of modern electronic music in composing the music. The Inazuma soundtrack was performed by the Tokyo Philharmonic Orchestra, with Hirofumi Kurita as the conductor and Sachiko Miyano of SHANGRI-LA Inc. as the scoring sessions director. The sound recording was done at multiple studios in China and Japan, and the mixing and mastering was done by music engineers Simon Rhodes and Simon Gibson of Abbey Road Studios in London. The recording process took around one and half months; the production for four months in total with preliminary communication accounted for.

Realm of Tranquil Eternity, the seventh soundtrack album to be produced for Genshin Impact and dedicated to the Inazuma Chapter, got released on September 22, 2021. Prior to that, its track listing was officially announced on September 17. The album featured sixty-two (62), all composed and arranged by Yu-Peng Chen.

The second soundtrack album dedicated to the Inazuma Chapter, Islands of the Lost and Forgotten, and the tenth album to be released for Genshin Impact, got released on April 13, 2022. Its track listing was first announced on April 7. The album featured a total of sixty (60) tracks for the Watatsumi Island, Seirai Island, Tsurumi Island areas and the Enkanomiya region; the music was composed by Yu-Peng Chen, Dimeng Yuan, Qian Ding, Yijun Jiang, and Xin Zhao. It was a co-production between HOYO-MiX and Sony Music Entertainment Japan

Sumeru soundtrack

The music of Sumeru region took inspiration from various cultures and regions of the North Africa Middle East and South Asia. For the rainforest area inspired by South Asia, the music featured traditional instruments included the bansuri performed by Eliza Marshall, the sitar performed by Jonathan Mayer and Arjun Verma, and the tabla performed by Kuljit Bhamra, among others. The composers incorporated elements of yoga music into their work to give the music "a feeling of contemporary wisdom and spirituality". Composer Yu-Peng Chen also took reference from symphonic suites by Russian classical composer Nikolai Rimsky-Korsakov and orchestration elements from Rimsky-Korsakov's "Scheherazade". The desert area, which was inspired by the Middle East, the traditional instruments featured included the ney performed by John Plotner, the duduk performed by Martin Robertson, and the saz performed by Dursun Can Çakin. Kuljit Bhamra of Red Fort Studios took on the role of supervisor for the folk instrumental performances. The London Symphony Orchestra, along with conductor Robert Ziegler returning from the Mondstadt soundtrack, performed majority of the music. The orchestra recording was done at Abbey Road Studios in London. Other guest folk musicians included Baha Yetkin, Attab, and Kian on the oud, Steve Smith on the bouzouki and mandolin, Maya Youssef on the kanun, Peyman on the santur. Mixing engineer Simon Gibson of Abbey Road Studios returned from the Liyue music production to work on the Sumeru soundtrack.

Forest of Jnana and Vidya, the fourteenth  Genshin Impact soundtrack album to be produced, is dedicated to the Sumeru Chapter. The track listing was officially announced on October 18, 2022, and the album got released on October 20. It featured a total of one-hundred (100) tracks composed by Yu-Peng Chen, Dimeng Yuan, Qian Ding, Yijun Jiang, and Xin Zhao. Aside from the London Symphony Orchestra, other participating orchestra groups included the Budapest Scoring Orchestra, International Master Philharmonic Orchestra, and The City of Prague Philharmonic Orchestra. Other participating musicians included Jiannan Gu on the bansuri, Ashley Blasse and Ye Fan on the classical guitar, and Stephanie Gonley and Ming Liu on the violin.

Fleeting Colors in Flight

Fleeting Colors in Flight is the eighth soundtrack and first EP album produced by HOYO-MiX and released in 2022 for the video game Genshin Impact.

The album was performed by Yu-Peng Chen as composer and Dimeng Yuan as arranger and produced in Shanghai Media Group. The first track single Devastation and Redemptiom was released on January 15, 2022 only one to three soundtrack was released. The vocals Yun Jin voice actor Yang Yang were performed in Shanghai Jingju Theater Company  Later, The two Myriad of Lights and instrumental version of Devastation and Redemption  got released on January 31, 2022. All three soundtracks in the album were composed by HOYO-MiX. and it's dedicated to the version 2.4 soundtrack release of Genshin Impact.

Music team
 Jinhan "Zoe" Cai, music director of miHoYo and manager of HOYO-MiX. 
 Yu-Peng "Zhiyi" Chen, leads the music production for Genshin Impact.
 Dimeng Yuan, first appeared in The Stellar Moments (2021).
 Qian Ding, first appeared in The Stellar Moments (2021).
 Yijun Jiang, first appeared in the Honkai Impact 3rd soundtrack album Paradox (2022) before appearing in Islands of the Lost and Forgotten (2022).
 Xin Zhao, first appeared in Fleeting Colors in Flight (2022).
 Zimin "Arcangelo" Chen, first appeared in Footprints of the Traveler (2022).
 Peijia You, first appeared in Footprints of the Traveler (2022).

Guest artists
 Jiade He, credited as an orchestrator and arranger in The Shimmering Voyage (2021) and The Shimmering Voyage Vol. 2 (2022).
 Simai Wang, credited as an arranger in The Shimmering Voyage and The Stellar Moments Vol. 2 (2021), the latter where Wang was also an electric guitarist.

Reception
Red Thomas of MMORPG.com said, "The Genshin Impact score is massive, complex, and exceptional with clear multi-cultural inspirations.  I haven't played the game enough to say for sure, but I feel like the combat music is changing from region to region, which is a level of ambition that is just ridiculous.  Even from what I've heard of the soundtrack so far tells me that composer Yu-Peng Chen stretched successfully to pull motifs and sounds from a diverse set of inspirations to produce what might be the most complex suite of compositions for a single game that I've ever found."

Antonia Haynes of Goomba Stomp Magazine said, "...[Developer] miHoYo and Yu-Peng Chen—along with HOYO-MiX—clearly didn't want to treat this project any differently than you would any other game, film, or television series. In fact, they go above and beyond to create a soundtrack that revitalizes a game where the music may not have received that kind of attention had anyone else taken the reigns. Genshin Impact is an example of what can be done when you have enough passion for a project, no matter what kind of game it is."

Awards and nominations

References

External links
 HOYO-MiX on NetEase Cloud Music
 HOYO-MiX on QQ Music
 HOYO-MiX on Apple Music
 HOYO-MiX on Spotify
 HOYO-MiX on YouTube
 HOYO-MiX on YouTube Music
 HOYO-MiX on Facebook
 HOYO-MiX on Bilibili
 HOYO-MiX on Sina Weibo
 HOYO-MiX on Twitter
 HOYO-MiX on Twitter (Japanese)

Genshin Impact
Video game soundtracks